The 2016 African Nations Championship qualification was a men's football competition which decided the participating teams of the 2016 African Nations Championship. Only national team players who were playing in their country's own domestic league were eligible to compete in the tournament.

A total of sixteen teams qualified to play in the final tournament, including Rwanda who qualified automatically as hosts.

Teams

A total of 42 CAF member national teams entered the qualifying rounds, split into zones according to their regional affiliations.

Notes
Algeria were excluded by the CAF from participating because of their withdrawal against Libya in the 2014 African Nations Championship qualification.

Format
In the Northern Zone, teams played each other on a double round-robin basis. The teams were ranked according to points (3 points for a win, 1 point for a draw, 0 points for a loss). If tied on points, tiebreakers would be applied in the following order:
Number of points obtained in games between the teams concerned;
Goal difference in games between the teams concerned;
Goals scored in games between the teams concerned;
Away goals scored in games between the teams concerned;
If, after applying criteria 1 to 4 to several teams, two teams still have an equal ranking, criteria 1 to 4 are reapplied exclusively to the matches between the two teams in question to determine their final rankings. If this procedure does not lead to a decision, criteria 6 to 9 apply;
Goal difference in all games;
Goals scored in all games;
Away goals scored in all games;
Drawing of lots.

In all other zones, qualification ties were played on a home-and-away two-legged basis. If the aggregate score was tied after the second leg, the away goals rule would be applied, and if still level, the penalty shoot-out would be used to determine the winner (no extra time would be played).

The top two teams in the Northern Zone and the 13 winners of the first round in all other zones qualified for the final tournament.

Schedule
The draw was held on 5 April 2015, 16:00 UTC+2, at the CAF Headquarters in Cairo, Egypt.

The schedule of the qualifying rounds was as follows.

Northern Zone

Note: Libya played their home matches in Morocco and Tunisia due to security concerns.

Zone West A

Seeded teams

Unseeded teams

Preliminary round

|}

Note: Guinea and Sierra Leone played their home matches in Mali and Mauritania respectively due to the Ebola outbreak (Sierra Leone home match brought forward by a week).

Mali won 4–2 on aggregate.

Mauritania won 4–1 on aggregate.

Guinea won 4–2 on aggregate.

Senegal won 4–1 on aggregate.

First round
Winners qualified for 2016 African Nations Championship.

|}

Note: Guinea played their home match in Mali due to the Ebola outbreak.

Mali won 3–2 on aggregate.

3–3 on aggregate. Guinea won on away goals.

Zone West B

Seeded teams

Unseeded teams

First round
Winners qualified for 2016 African Nations Championship.

|}

Note: Second leg of Ivory Coast v Ghana delayed by a week due to presidential elections.

2–2 on aggregate. Ivory Coast won on away goals.

Nigeria won 2–0 on aggregate.

Niger won 3–1 on aggregate.

Central Zone

Seeded teams

Unseeded teams

First round
Winners qualified for 2016 African Nations Championship.

|}

Note: Central African Republic withdrew. Second leg of Congo v Cameroon postponed to 31 October due to civil unrest.

DR Congo won on walkover.

Cameroon won 1–0 on aggregate.

Gabon won 2–1 on aggregate.

Central-East Zone
 qualified automatically for the final tournament as hosts.
 received a bye to the first round.

Seeded teams

Unseeded teams

Preliminary round

|}

Uganda won 4–1 on aggregate.

Burundi won 4–1 on aggregate.

Ethiopia won 2–0 on aggregate.

First round
Winners qualified for 2016 African Nations Championship.

|}

Uganda won 4–0 on aggregate.

Ethiopia won 3–2 on aggregate.

Southern Zone

Seeded teams

Unseeded teams

Preliminary round

|}

Zimbabwe won 2–0 on aggregate.

1–1 on aggregate. Lesotho won on away goals.

3–3 on aggregate. Zambia won on penalties.

Mozambique won 9–1 on aggregate.

South Africa won 5–0 on aggregate.

Angola won 4–2 on aggregate.

First round
Winners qualified for 2016 African Nations Championship.

|}

Zimbabwe won 4–2 on aggregate.

Zambia won 4–1 on aggregate.

Angola won 3–2 on aggregate.

Qualified teams
The following 16 teams qualified for the final tournament.

1 Bold indicates champion for that year. Italic indicates host for that year.

Goalscorers
4 goals
 Luís

3 goals

 Gelson
 Gatoch Panom
 Farouk Miya
 Winston Kalengo
 Rodreck Mutuma

2 goals

 Ary Papel
 Laudit Mavugo
 Abbas Nshimirimana
 Joel Fameyeh
 Sékou Amadou Camara
 Abdoulaye Sissoko
 Taghiyoulla Denna
 Abdelilah Hafidi
 Mohamed Ounajem
 Reinildo
 Benyamin Nenkavu
 Koffi Dan Kowa
 Ibrahima Keita
 Mamadou Niang
 Siphelele Ntshangase
 Saad Bguir
 Erisa Ssekisambu
 Festus Mbewe

1 goal

 Dário
 Mateus
 Mpho Kgaswane
 Hassan Bizimana
 Shasir Nahimana
 Ronald Ngah Wandja
 Nassar Ndiguem
 Darar Djama Aboubaker
 Aschalew Girma
 Seyoum Tesfaye
 Rick Martel Allogho Mba
 Richy Mandraut
 Salif Krubally
 Alsény Camara Agogo
 Kilé Bangoura
 Ibrahima Sory Sankhon
 Aboubacar Iyanga Sylla
 Aboubacar Mouctar Sylla
 Malam Fati
 Obetchi
 Koffi Boua
 Ibrahima Sangaré
 Thabiso Brown
 Ralekoti Mokhahlane
 Tsepo Seturumane
 Allison Dweh
 Gobeom Sie Vitalis
 Moayed Al Khritli
 Moussa Bakayoko
 Abdoulaye Diarra
 Boubacar Diarra
 Ismaël Koné
 Aly Abeid
 Boubacar Beyguili
 Mohamed Yali Dellahi
 Mamadou Niass
 Abderrahim Achchakir
 Abdessalam Benjelloun
 Rachid Housni
 Mouhcine Iajour
 Abdeladim Khadrouf
 Abdessamad Lembarki
 Marwane Saâdane
 Diogo
 Gildo
 Momed Hagi
 Isac
 Willy Stephanus
 Idrissa Halidou Garba
 Yaro Bature
 Gbolahan Salami
 Abdoulaye Ba
 Sylvain Badji
 Mouhamad Waliou Ndoye
 Gervais Waye-Hive
 Sallieu Tarawallie
 Thamsanqa Gabuza
 Fagrie Lakay
 Wandisile Letlabika
 Mandla Masango
 Sabelo Ndzinisa
 Tony Tsabedze
 Raphael Bocco
 Gnama Akaté
 Karim Aouadhi
 Ali Machani
 Frank Kalanda
 Kizito Keziron
 Caesar Okhuti
 Conlyde Luchanga
 Spencer Sautu
 Marshall Mudehwe
 Danny Phiri
 Evans Rusike

Own goal

 Fabrício (playing against South Africa)
 Aly Abeid (playing against Mali)

References

External links
Orange African Nations Championship Qualifiers, Rwanda 2016, CAFonline.com

2016
Qualification
2015 in African football